Robert S. Meitus (born Ann Arbor, Michigan, United States) is an American guitarist, singer, and lawyer.

He played in West Lafayette, Indiana and Los Angeles with the alternative rock band, East of Eden (formerly The Sound), in the mid-1980s and later in 1990, formed folk rock group The Dorkestra in New York City, which recorded three albums, 100 Flowers, Sideways South and 11593.

Meitus married singer-songwriter Carrie Newcomer in 1993, and soon joined her band and began managing her career.

Meitus is a graduate of Wabash College, with a B.A. in political science, Columbia University, with a Masters of International Affairs and Indiana University School of Law—Bloomington with a J.D.

He now practices law with the intellectual property and entertainment boutique firm Meitus Gelbert Rose LLP in Indianapolis, teaches law at Indiana University, manages several music artists and is married to and lives with Newcomer in Bloomington, Indiana.

External links
The Dorkestra

Year of birth missing (living people)
Living people
American rock guitarists
American male guitarists
American male singers
American rock singers
American lawyers
Wabash College alumni
School of International and Public Affairs, Columbia University alumni
Indiana University alumni